Supermodel po-ukrainsky, cycle 7  (subtitled as Super Top Model po-ukrainsky) is the seventh season of Top Model po-ukrainsky. This season, twenty girls from previous cycles of "Supermodel po-ukrainsky" and "Top Model po-ukrainsky", will compete for the title.

Among with the prizes is: a cash prize of 300,000₴, a cover of Marie Claire in Ukraine, and a campaign for Make Up UA.

Contestants 
(ages stated are at start of contest)

Episodes

Episode 1
Original airdate: 

Immune: Amina Dosimbaeva, Dasha Maystrenko, Katya Chechelenko, Margo Verhovtseva, Tanya Brik & Sofi Beridze
Best photo: Sasha Kugat
First Eliminated: Anya Sulima, Anna-Kristina Prihodko, Karina Minayeva, Karina Danilova, Katya Svinarchuk & Liza Doronko
Bottom two: Nastya Leuhina & Arina Lyubityelyeva
Second Eliminated: None

Episode 2
Original airdate: 
Disqualified: Katya Chechelenko
Quit: Nastya Leuhina
Best photo: Margo Verhovtseva
Bottom two: Ira Rotar & Sofi Beridze
Second Eliminated: None

Episode 3
Original airdate: 

Best photo: Vika Rogalchuk
Bottom two: Nastya Panova & Ira Rotar
Eliminated: Nastya Panova

Episode 4
Original airdate: 

Best photo: Tanya Bryk
Bottom two: Dasha Maystrenko & Margo Verhovtseva
Eliminated: Dasha Maystrenko

Episode 5
Original airdate: 

Best photo: Arina Lyubityelyeva
Bottom two: Amina Dosimbaeva & Ira Rotar
Eliminated: Ira Rotar

Episode 6
Original airdate: 

Best photo: Ira Moysak
First Eliminated: Sofi Beridze
Second Eliminated: Vika Rogalchuk
Bottom two: Amina Dosimbaeva & Margo Verhovtseva
Second Eliminated: Amina Dosimbaeva

Episode 7
Original airdate: 

Returned: Dasha Maystrenko
Quit: Sasha Kugat
Best photo: Tanya Bryk
Bottom two: Ira Moysak & Margo Verhovtseva
Eliminated: Margo Verhovtseva

Episode 8
Original airdate: 

Best photo: Dasha Maystrenko
Bottom two: Arina Lyubityelyeva & Ira Moysak
Eliminated: None

Episode 9
Original airdate: 

Shoot out: Arina Lyubityelyeva & Ira Moysak
First eliminated outside of panel: Arina Lyubityelyeva
Second eliminated outside of panel: Ira Moysak

Episode 10
Original airdate: 

Final three: Dasha Maystrenko, Sasha Litvin & Tanya Bryk
Ukraine's Next Top Model: Tanya Bryk

Summaries

Results 

 The contestant was eliminated
  The contestant was in danger of elimination
  The contestant was eliminated
  The contestant was eliminated outside the judging panel
  The contestant was disqualified
  The contestant was originally eliminated, but was saved.
  The contestant quit the competition
  The contestant was immune from elimination
  The contestant won best photo
  The contestant won the competition

Photo shoot guide 
 Episode 1 photo shoot: Hanging on giant clock
 Episode 2 photo shoot: Re-work on previous photoshoots, dance in the garden
 Episode 3 photo shoot: Hanging on fabric
 Episode 4 photo shoot: Luxury Party
 Episode 5 photo shoot: Women professions
 Episode 6 photo shoot: Perfectil advertisement, hanging on Eiffel tower
 Episode 7 photo shoot: Animals from red book
 Episode 8 photo shoot: Sckifs
 Episode 9 life-photo shoot: Against domestic violence
 Episode 10 photo shoot: Hanging on lustre

References 

Ukraine
2018 Ukrainian television seasons